Grae Cameron Garcia Fernandez (born November 7, 2001) is a Filipino actor, host and recording artist. He is best known as one of the vocalists of Star Magic's boy-group Gimme 5.

Early life
Fernandez was born on November 7, 2001, in Manila, Philippines. He is the elder of two sons to actor Mark Anthony Fernandez and wife Melissa Garcia Fernandez. His younger brother is Rudolf Venedictos Garcia Fernandez.

He belongs to one of the most prominent clans in showbiz. He is the great grandson of actor Gregorio Fernandez, who married Pilar Padilla from the Padilla family, another clan of actors. He is the grandson of action icon, Rudy Fernandez and actress-politician, Alma Moreno. He is also the half-nephew of  Vandolph Quizon, Renz Fernandez, Ralph Fernandez and  Winwyn Marquez.

Grae is the nephew of Rommel Padilla's sons (Daniel and RJ Padilla), Robin Padilla's daughters (his 3 daughters and 1 son to former wife Liezl Sicangco) which are Kylie, Queenie, Zhen-Zhen, and Ali Padilla, and to actress-reporter Erika Padilla.

Career
Fernandez first appeared on TV in a 2013 Jollibee Summer Bucket Treats commercial. He made his television debut on the ABS-CBN game show Minute To Win It - Junior Edition which was then hosted by Luis Manzano.

In December 2013, Fernandez joined the boy-group Gimme 5 - a band formed by ABS-CBN's Star Magic along with Nash Aguas as leader, Joaquin Lucas Reyes, Brace Henry Arquiza and John Emmanuel Bermundo. They were introduced on ASAP wherein the band performed The Wanted's, Glad You Came.

Gimme 5 released their self-titled debut album in November 2014 under Star Music. The track list of the all-original, pop-rock album includes "Pag Kasama Ka", "Aking Prinsesa" , "Hey Girl", "Growing Up", "Ikaw Na Na" and its carrier single "Hatid Sundo". The following year, the group held a series of TV guestings and mall shows to promote their album. The group kicked off their "Gimme5 Best Summer Ever" album tour a few weeks ago.

In August 2014, Fernandez started his acting career as a cast member of "Perfecto" an episode in fantasy-drama, comedy anthology Wansapanataym  which is produced and aired by ABS-CBN every Saturdays and Sundays. He was later on cast as supporting character in the teen drama TV series, Bagito.

Fernandez was then cast in a special participation as one of the young characters in the 2015 Primetime TV series Bridges of Love. He played Manuel "JR" Nakpil JR/Carlos Antonio (later portrayed by Paulo Avelino) a hopeful high school student who sells cigarettes at night. Fernandez stirred everyone's curiosity about the boy who rose from the slums when Baron Geisler's character adopted him. He was subsequently cast as a supporting character in the remake version of Primetime TV series Pangako Sa 'Yo as Jonathan "Egoy" Mobido originally by Patrick Garcia. He appeared in Book 1 as the love interest of Lia Buenavista played by Andrea Brillantes.

In August 2015, Fernandez made his film debut  as one of the supporting cast in a certified box-office hit movie The Love Affair top-billed by Richard Gomez, Dawn Zulueta and Bea Alonzo. In the film, he played the role of Timmy the youngest child of Vince and Trisha.

Filmography

Television

Film

Awards and nominations

References

2001 births
Living people
ABS-CBN personalities
Star Magic
Star Magic personalities
Star Music artists
Filipino male television actors
Male actors from Manila
Filipino television personalities
21st-century Filipino male singers
Grae
English-language singers from the Philippines